U is a 2006 French animated film directed by Serge Élissalde and Grégoire Solotareff. It was at the 2007 Seattle International Film Festival.

References

External links
 
 

2006 films
2006 animated films
French animated films
2000s French films